Sociosa is a genus of moths belonging to the subfamily Tortricinae of the family Tortricidae.

Species
Sociosa macrographa (Diakonoff, 1951)
Sociosa nesima Razowski, 2012

See also
List of Tortricidae genera

References

 , 2005: World catalogue of insects volume 5 Tortricidae.
 , 2012: Tortricines in the fauna of Nepal (Lepidoptera: Tortricidae). Polish Journal of Entomology 81 (1): 91–99. Full article: .

External links
tortricidae.com

Polyorthini
Tortricidae genera